"Mamacita" is the first single release from Mark Medlock's debut album Club Tropicana. The single was released on 24 April 2009. It is written, composed, arranged and produced by the German artist Dieter Bohlen.

Track listings
CD single Columbia 88697 52104 2, 24 April 2009
"Mamacita" (Single Version) 3:33
"Mamacita" (Karaoke Version) 4:07

CD maxi-single Columbia 88697 52106 2, 24 April 2009
"Mamacita" (Single Version) 3:33
"Mamacita" (Karaoke Version) 4:07
"Heart to Heart" (Alana Remix) - 3:52

Credits
 Lyrics and music - Dieter Bohlen
 Arrangement - Dieter Bohlen
 Production - Dieter Bohlen
 Co-production - Jeo
 Art direction - Ronald Reinsberg
 Photography - Nikolaj Georgiew
 Publication - Blue Obsession/Warner Chappell
 Mixing - Jeo@Jeopark

Charts

References

2009 singles
Columbia Records singles
Song recordings produced by Dieter Bohlen
Songs written by Dieter Bohlen